Berghia marinae is a species of sea slugs, an aeolid nudibranch. It is a shell-less marine gastropod mollusc in the family Aeolidiidae.

Distribution
This species was described from the Tacoma wreck dive site, in Senegal.

References

Aeolidiidae
Gastropods described in 2014